The 1988–89 American Indoor Soccer Association season was the fifth season for the league.  In the offseason, the league announced new scoring rules with goals being worth either 1, 2, or 3 points based on distance and/or game situation.  Before the season, teams were added in Chicago and Hershey. During the season, the league took control of the Memphis Storm team on December 18 because the ownership had financial issues. After the season, the league announced that an expansion team based in Atlanta would join for 1989–90 season.

League Standings

Playoffs

League Leaders

Scoring

Goalkeeping

League awards
Most Valuable Player: Rudy Pikuzinski, Canton 
Coach of the Year: John Dolinsky, Milwaukee 
Defender of the Year: Tim Tyma, Milwaukee 
Goalkeeper of the Year: Jamie Swanner, Canton 
Rookie of the Year: Carlos Pena, Dayton

All-AISA Teams

References

External links
Major Indoor Soccer League II (RSSSF)
1989 in American Soccer

1988 in American soccer leagues
1989 in American soccer leagues
1988-89